Ivan Murada (born 4 April 1965) is an Italian ski mountaineer.

Selected results 
 1997:
 1st, Trofeo "Rinaldo Maffeis" (together with Graziano Boscacci)
 1998:
 3rd, Sellaronda Skimarathon (together with Ivan Murada)<ref name="sellaronda">[http://www.newspower.it/comunicati/sellaronda/AlbodoroSellaronda.rtf Sellarond ski marathon - roll of honor"]</ref>
 1999:
 1st, Trofeo "Rinaldo Maffeis" (together with Graziano Boscacci)
 2nd, Sellaronda Skimarathon (together with Ivan Murada)
 2000:
 7th (and 2nd in "seniors II" ranking), Patrouille des Glaciers, together with Graziano Boscacci and Camillo Vescovo
 2001:
 1st, Sellaronda Skimarathon (together with Graziano Boscacci)
 1st, Tour du Rutor (together with Graziano Boscacci)
 2002:
 1st, World Championship team race (together with Graziano Boscacci)
 3rd, World Championship combination ranking
 3rd, Sellaronda Skimarathon (together with Ivan Murada)
 4th, World Championship single race
 2005:
 2nd, European Championship team race (together with Graziano Boscacci)
 2006:
 3rd, Adamello Ski Raid (together with Graziano Boscacci and Daniele Pedrini)
 2007:
 1st, Trofeo "Rinaldo Maffeis"'' (together with Guido Giacomelli)
 3rd, Sellaronda Skimarathon (together with Ivan Murada)
 2008:
 2nd, Sellaronda Skimarathon (together with Ivan Murada)
 7th, World Championship team race (together with Lorenzo Holzknecht)
 2012:
 Received oral

Pierra Menta 

 1995: 9th, together with Graziano Boscacci
 1998: 6th, together with Graziano Boscacci
 1999: 4th, together with Graziano Boscacci
 2000: 5th, together with Graziano Boscacci
 2001: 2nd, together with Graziano Boscacci
 2002: 1st, together with Graziano Boscacci
 2003: 5th, together with Graziano Boscacci
 2004: 5th, together with Graziano Boscacci
 2005: 4th, together with Graziano Boscacci
 2006: 7th, together with Graziano Boscacci
 2007: 8th, together with Daniele Pedrini
 2008: 6th, together with Tony Sbalbi

Trofeo Mezzalama 

 1999: 3rd, together with Graziano Boscacci and Luca Negroni
 2001: 1st, together with Graziano Boscacci and Heinz Blatter
 2003: 5th, together with Graziano Boscacci and Heinz Blatter
 2007: 5th, together with Graziano Boscacci and Mirco Mezzanotte
 2009: 4th, together with Graziano Boscacci and Pietro Lanfranchi

References

External links 
 Ivan Murada at SkiMountaineering.org
 Boscacci & Murada at PlanetMountain.com

1965 births
Living people
Italian male ski mountaineers
World ski mountaineering champions